The 2010–11 Australian Baseball League season was the inaugural Australian Baseball League (ABL) season, and was held from 6 November 2010 to 13 February 2011. It came 12 years after the old Australian Baseball League ceased and is the successor of the mostly amateur Claxton Shield competition that has been played since 1934. The season consisted of six teams competing in a 40-game schedule, followed by a three-round finals series to determine the ABL champion.

At the conclusion of the regular season, the Sydney Blue Sox, Perth Heat, Adelaide Bite and Melbourne Aces progressed to the finals series, while the Brisbane Bandits and Canberra Cavalry were only eliminated from contention on the final day of the season. Both Melbourne and Sydney were eliminated by Adelaide in the minor semi-final series and the preliminary final series, respectively. Perth became the inaugural ABL champions when they defeated Adelaide two games to one in the championship series.

Formation 

In June 2009, it was announced that the rights to the Claxton Shield had been sold to a new Australian Baseball League, with ownership split between Major League Baseball's 75 percent share and the 25 percent share owned by the Australian Baseball Federation. The 2010 Claxton Shield tournament was considered preparation for the inaugural ABL season.

Although initial reports suggested that between eight and ten teams would contest the first season, including the possibility of a team based in New Zealand, six teams representing Adelaide, Brisbane, Canberra, Melbourne, Perth and Sydney were announced in November 2009 as the foundation clubs.

Compared to the previous season's Claxton Shield tournament, there were few structural changes to the competition. With the expansion from five to six teams, the need for teams to have a bye was eliminated, with all teams participating in games each round. The individual rounds were expanded from three to four games per round, resulting in an increase from 24 to 40 games per team for the season. The postseason was also expanded to include the top four teams, rather than only the top three.

Teams

Rosters 

During the season each team made use of a 22-man active roster, drawn from 35-man squads announced on 28 October 2010.

Venues 
Four of the six teams used their existing venues from the Claxton Shield: the Adelaide Bite, Perth Heat and Sydney Blue Sox all used the same grounds used in the 2010 Claxton Shield by the respective state teams, and the Canberra Cavalry used the same venue used by Australia Provincial when they last contested the Claxton Shield in 2008: Narrabundah Ballpark.

The Melbourne Aces played at the Melbourne Showgrounds, after the Victorian state government announced a A$300,000 upgrade of the grounds. Similarly the Queensland state government announced a A$300,000 upgrade of the Brisbane Exhibition Ground for use by the Brisbane Bandits as their home field.

Regular season 

The regular season was held from 6 November 2010 through to 22 January 2011. All six teams competed in a double round-robin format, playing each other team in two series of four games each, totalling 40 games played each. The top four teams progressed to the postseason. The winner of the championship series will be awarded the Claxton Shield.

At the end of the regular season, the Sydney Blue Sox finished in first place with a 24–15 win–loss record. Half a game behind Sydney were the Perth Heat in second place. The third place team was the Adelaide Bite a further game behind. The Melbourne Aces finished in fourth place six games behind the Blue Sox. The Brisbane Bandits and Canberra Cavalry, who played only 36 games due to 2010–11 Queensland floods, finished in fifth and sixth place, eight and a half and ten and a half games behind the leader respectively.

Standings

Opening night 
The season started on 6 November 2010, when the Sydney Blue Sox hosted the Canberra Cavalry at Blacktown Olympic Park. The Blue Sox won the inaugural game of the league, defeating the Cavalry 1–0. In what was effectively a pitchers' duel, Blue Sox starting pitcher Chris Oxspring was the stand-out performer for the night, having scattered 3 hits and 1 walk over 6 innings and striking out 8. The Cavalry, however, opted to use several pitchers, each throwing two complete innings.

Sydney left fielder Tim Auty registered the league's first hit of the season in the bottom of the first with a line drive single to centre field. Canberra did not register a hit until the fourth inning to see their first baserunner when third baseman Kyu-Hyun Moon singled to right field.

The game had been scoreless through the first seven innings, despite Sydney loading the bases in the bottom of the sixth against reliever Lee Jung-Min: right fielder David Kandilas walked to lead off the inning, and was followed by third baseman Trent D'Antonio with a single to left field. Auty hit a sacrifice bunt to move both runners over, leading the Cavalry to intentionally walk centre fielder Mitch Dening. The Blue Sox were unable to capitalise on the opportunity, when designated hitter Patrick Maat struck out and catcher Andrew Graham grounded out.

Sydney scored the only run of the night in the eighth inning against reliever Heo Jun-Hyeok. With two out, Auty singled to left field for his second hit of the night, then stole second base. He was then driven in by Dening, who singled to centre field. Dening also stole second, but was stranded there at the end of the inning. In the top of the ninth, relievers Matthew Williams and Koo Dae-Sung combined to close the game out, earning a hold and save respectively.

Round 1 
The Melbourne Aces played the Adelaide Bite at Coopers Stadium in Adelaide, the Perth Heat played against the Brisbane Bandits at the Brisbane Exhibition Ground, and the Sydney Blue Sox and Canberra Cavalry continued their series at Blacktown Olympic Park for the first round of the season.

Adelaide v Melbourne 
The Adelaide Bite won its opening game for the season, defeating the Melbourne Aces 9–1, in large part due to the Paul Mildren's pitching and Ben Wigmore's hitting. Mildren pitched 7 scoreless innings, allowing 6 hits and struck out 5, while Wigmore went 4–for–5 with a double, a home run and 5 runs batted in. Despite scoring first in the second inning through back-to-back doubles from Grant Karlsen and Itaru Hashimoto, the Aces lost the second game of the series 7–4. the Bite's starting pitcher Darren Fidge was once again the standout; he pitched 8 innings and allowed 3 runs on 3 hits and 3 walks, and struck out 7. Quincy Latimore went 4–for–8 over the two games of the doubleheader; he hit a 3-run home run in the first inning and took a catch at the left field wall in the fifth inning of game one to help Adelaide to a 13–2 win, then hit two more home runs in the second game where Adelaide won 8–3 to complete the series sweep.

Brisbane v Perth 
The Brisbane Bandits and the Perth Heat opened their seasons in Brisbane. The ceremonial first pitch was thrown by Graeme Lloyd and caught by the Bandits' manager Dave Nilsson; the only all-Australian battery to appear in a Major League Baseball game and both Baseball Australia Hall of Fame inductees in their own right. Despite Robbie Widlansky's two extra base hits and his scoring two runs, Perth was unable to take the lead at any point in the game. Brisbane's Wade Dutton, Shuhei Fukuda, Alan Schoenberger, and Joel Naughton each had multi-hit games to help the Bandits to an 8–3 win. Widlansky was a key player for the Heat again in the second game, which Perth won 2–0, opening the scoring with a solo home run. Daniel Schmidt was the other key player; he was the starting pitcher and pitched 8 innings, allowing no runs on 5 hits and striking out 8 Bandits. Perth also won both games of the doubleheader—4–2 in the day game and 4–1 in the night game—to win its opening series. In the day game Brandon Dale went 3–for–4 with a double and a run batted in, and Luke Hughes went 1–for–2 scoring 2 runs, including scoring a run from his lead-off triple in the fifth inning. Heat pitchers Warwick Saupold, Tyler Anderson, Robert Sorensen, and Liam Hendriks combined to keep the Bandits to 1 run on 7 hits, striking out 11 Brisbane hitters.

Sydney v Canberra 
Six days after the opening night of the season Sydney and Canberra continued their series at Blacktown Olympic Park. Three of the Blue Sox's key players from that opening night gave repeat performances to defeat the Cavalry 4–2: Chris Oxspring was the starting pitcher for Sydney and pitched 8 innings, having allowed 2 runs on 4 hits and struck out 7 to earn the win; Koo Dae-Sung retired the three Cavalry hitters he faced for a scoreless ninth inning to earn the save; Mitch Dening hit a ground rule double with the bases loaded to drive in the go-ahead run in the bottom of the fifth inning. In the first game of the season to be called early as a result of the league's run differential rule, Sydney comfortably beat Canberra 13–3. Though the Blue Sox combined to hit 7–for–17 with runners in scoring position and 7 runs driven in with two out, they were aided by 2 wild pitches by Cavalry pitchers, 3 passed balls by catcher Michael Collins, and 4 errors in the field, resulting in only 3 of the 13 runs scored by the Blue Sox being earned. Alex Johnson's 3-run home run in the bottom of the seventh inning was the difference in the final game of the series, helping Sydney to a 7–5 win and to sweep Canberra 4–0 in the series.

Round 2 
The Perth Heat had their home opening series, hosting the Adelaide Bite at Baseball Park as did Canberra Cavalry in facing the Melbourne Aces at Narrabundah Ballpark. The Brisbane Bandits continued their homestand, playing the Sydney Blue Sox at the Brisbane Exhibition Ground.

Perth v Adelaide 
In their first game at home for the season, Perth defeated Adelaide 4–2. Matt Kennelly and Luke Hughes each hit home runs in the fourth and fifth innings respectively to lead the Heat offence. Despite home runs from Evan McArthur and Ronnie Welty, Adelaide were able to square the series by winning 7–3 in the second game; James McOwen homered as part of the Bite's 6-run sixth inning, while Quincy Latimore hit his 4th home run of the season in the seventh. Tied at 4–4 at the end of nine innings, game three went into extra innings. Ronnie Welty produced a walk-off home run in the bottom of the twelfth inning; his second home run in as many days to give the Heat a 6–4 win. The final game of the series was won by Adelaide 4–3. Quincy Latimore hit an RBI-double in the top of the ninth inning to put the Bite in front. In trying to score the tying run, Matt Kennelly was thrown out at home plate by James McOwen in center field for the final out of the game.

Canberra v Melbourne

Brisbane v Sydney

Round 3 
The third round of the season had the same match-ups of teams from the previous round, but with a switch of home and away teams: the Adelaide Bite hosted the Perth Heat at Coopers Stadium, the Melbourne Aces had their home opener against the Canberra Cavalry at the Melbourne Showgrounds, and the Sydney Blue Sox faced the Brisbane Bandits at Blacktown Olympic Park.

Adelaide v Perth

Melbourne v Canberra 
The Melbourne Aces were scheduled to open their first home series of the season on Friday, 26 November but had to wait for two days and three games to be rained out. As a result, the series was shortened to two 7 inning games played on Sunday, 28 November. In the first game the Aces scored all their runs from four home runs, including 2-run shots from Scott Wearne (2–for–3) in the first inning and Grant Karlsen (2–for–3 with a double) in the fourth, allowing Melbourne to win 6–2. Wearne hit another first-inning home run in the second game, but the highlight—also in the first inning—of the game was a grand slam from Takahiro Ijyuin. Both home runs helped to set up a comfortable 10–2 win for the Aces to complete a sweep of the shortened series.

Sydney v Brisbane

Round 4 
The Canberra Cavalry returned to the Narrabundah Ballpark to host the Adelaide Bite. The Perth Heat also returned to their home ground at Baseball Park to face the Brisbane Bandits, completing their season series. The Sydney Blue Sox completed their homestand against the Melbourne Aces at Blacktown Olympic Park.

Canberra v Adelaide 
As was the case for Canberra's previous series in Melbourne, the opening game of the series was called off because of the rain before a pitch was thrown. The game was rescheduled for the following day as part of a doubleheader.

Perth v Brisbane 
Brisbane dominated Perth in the first game of the series to win in 8–1. Alan Schoenberger led the offence for the Bandits, hitting 3–for–4 with a double and a run batted in, as did Shuhei Fukuda with a home run in the first at bat of the game. Hiroki Yamada was credited with the win on the mound, pitching for 7 innings, allowing 1 run on 5 hits, striking out 8.

Sydney v Melbourne

Round 5 
The Adelaide Bite completed their road trip, facing the Brisbane Bandits at the Brisbane Exhibition Ground. The Perth Heat completed their homestand, playing the Canberra Cavalry at Baseball Park in Perth. The Melbourne Aces hosted the Sydney Blue Sox for the final games of their season series, including a makeup game from the previous round in Sydney.

Brisbane v Adelaide

Perth v Canberra

Melbourne v Sydney

Round 6 
The Canberra Cavalry hosted the Perth Heat at Narrabundah Ballpark to complete their season series. The Sydney Blue Sox continued their road trip, facing the Adelaide Bite at Coopers Stadium. The Melbourne Aces completed their homestand with two back–to–back series at the Melbourne Showgrounds; two games against the Cavalry to make up for the games washed out in round 3, and four against the Brisbane Bandits as was originally scheduled.

Canberra v Perth

Adelaide v Sydney

Melbourne v Canberra

Melbourne v Brisbane

Round 7 
The Adelaide Bite completed their homestand by hosting the Canberra Cavalry for a five–game series, including a game postponed from round 4 due to wet weather, at Coopers Stadium, Adelaide. The Brisbane Bandits returned home to complete their season series against the Melbourne Aces at the Brisbane Exhibition Ground. The Perth Heat faced the Sydney Blue Sox for the first time in the season, playing at Baseball Park, Perth.

Adelaide v Canberra

Brisbane v Melbourne

Perth v Sydney

Round 8 
The Melbourne Aces started their final homestand of the season at the Melbourne Showgrounds, facing the Adelaide Bite to complete their season series. The Canberra Cavalry and the Brisbane Bandits met for the first time, at Narrabundah Ballpark. The Sydney Blue Sox and Perth Heat completed their season series in back–to–back rounds, at Blacktown Olympic Park.

Melbourne v Adelaide 
Though Adelaide were able to put together an early 6-run lead through 3 home runs—including a grand slam from Tom Brice—Melbourne built their score throughout the game to win the opening game of the series 11–8. Of the Aces' 11 runs, 6 were unearned resulting from the Bite's 7 errors. In a reversal of form, Adelaide won the second game 6–3: two plays in the eighth inning that would otherwise have resulted in the third out were missed, each allowing the Bite to score an additional run to take the lead. For the third game in a row, the first team to score actually lost with Adelaide winning 9–2. Also continuing a trend in the series of runs scored from mistakes; both Bite runs scored in the sixth inning came when Melbourne's Shane Lindsay hit two consecutive hitters with bases loaded. Adelaide sealed the series win in the final game of the series, defeating Melbourne 10–7. The bite scored 5 runs without an out being recorded, including the first of two home runs from both Brandon Bantz and Tom Brice.

Canberra v Brisbane 
The first game of the series was tied after the ninth inning, with both sides having had the lead at different points in the game. In the twelfth inning, Rory Rhodes for Brisbane and Donald Lutz for Canberra each hit solo home runs to keep the game tied. Alan Schoenberger scored the winning run in the thirteenth inning for the Bandits to win 7–6; Schoenberger doubled to centre field, was advanced by Wade Dutton's sacrifice bunt, and scored on Trent Baker's sacrifice fly. Alan Schoenberger opened the scoring in the second game with a grand slam in the second inning, while Michael Collins likewise ended the scoring with a grand slam in the eighth inning to give the win to Canberra 9–7. Despite Donald Lutz's third home run in as many games, Brisbane won the third game 16–9, after converting 7 hits and 5 walks in the first two innings into 11 runs. After the fourth game was tied in the bottom of the ninth inning through Tylor Prudhome's RBI-single broke the tie immediately in the tenth inning with an RBI-single from Trent Baker and a 3-run double from Josh Roberts to give Brisbane the win 8–4 and Canberra its first series loss at home.

Sydney v Perth 
Despite having been swept at home by Sydney the previous weekend, and the addition of two Major Leaguers to the Blue Sox roster, Perth opened the series with a 3–1 win. A two-run single from Robbie Widlansky in the sixth inning proved the difference between the two teams. Allan de San Miguel's two 2-run home runs gave the Heat the lead in the second game and then provided insurance against a late Blue Sox rally, allowing Perth an 11–7 win. In his longest start of the season, Cole McCurry pitched 7 innings, allowing 3 earned runs on 6 hits, striking out 7 to get his first win in Perth's 4–3 victory, ensuring a Heat series win. Blue Sox manager Glenn Williams was ejected in the bottom of the sixth inning of the final game of the series, for arguing against two consecutive calls that according to him were "questionable". Had either call been made the other way, Sydney would likely have scored the first run of the game. Perth scored in each of the remaining innings to win the game 4–1, and complete the sweep of the series locking the season series at 4–4.

Round 9 
The Sydney Blue Sox hosted their final home series of the season, against the Adelaide Bite at Blacktown Olympic Park, Sydney. The Melbourne Aces and Perth Heat started their season series at the Melbourne Showgrounds. The Brisbane Bandits were scheduled to host the Canberra Cavalry at the Brisbane Exhibition Ground, however the ABL postponed the series as a result of widespread flooding in South East Queensland. At the time, a decision had not been made as to whether the games would be rescheduled, however it was announced approximately one week later that the games would be rescheduled to the Monday and Tuesday immediately following round 10 in the form of two doubleheaders, but only if either team had a chance of making the playoffs, and only the games required for one of the teams to qualify.

Sydney v Adelaide 
For the third game in a row, Sydney allowed their opponents to get a 4-run lead before scoring themselves. However, in the first game of the series against Adelaide, the Blue Sox were able to snap a season-long 4-game losing streak through a walk off single from Trent Schmutter that drove in Mark Holland to win 5–4. Sydney regained first place in the league with a second consecutive win over the Bite 4–3. David Welch was credited with his 5th win of the season (6 innings pitched, 1 unearned run, 5 hits, 8 strikeouts), and Koo Dae-Sung earned his league leading 10th save (2  innings pitched, 1 unearned run, 2 hits, 3 strikeouts). For the second time in three games, Sydney recorded a walk-off win, beating Adelaide 6–5 in extra innings. Mark Holland's 2-run home run tied the game in the eighth inning, while in the tenth Alex Johnson doubled, then Michael Lysaught—pinch running for Johnson—scored on catcher Brandon Bantz's wild throw to third base to score the winning run. The Blue Sox secured the series sweep by beating the Bite 6–2 in their final home game of the regular season. The four runs driven in by Andrew Graham, Trent Schmutter and Alex Johnson in the fifth inning gave Sydney the lead for the rest of the game.

Melbourne v Perth

Round 10

Adelaide v Brisbane

Canberra v Sydney

Perth v Melbourne 

The season length was similar to the 2010 Claxton Shield by spreading ten rounds over twelve weeks, playing only the season's first game in the first week and taking a week off for Christmas and Boxing Day. Six teams were involved, playing a four-game series every week totaling two series against each team, one at home and one away. In total, the schedule allowed for 40 regular season games per team before a four-team finals series. During the regular season, games were played Thursday to Sunday, varying depending on the series and team, with 18 games scheduled as doubleheaders on a Saturday. Doubleheaders were scheduled to have the first of the two games shortened to seven innings, with the second game using the full nine innings.

One of the regular season games resulted in a tie, which is unusual in baseball given the provision in the rules of the game to play extra innings to determine a winner. The game between the Sydney Blue Sox and the Melbourne Aces at Blacktown Olympic Park was the second game of a makeup doubleheader as a result of rain earlier that weekend washing out two games, and so had been shortened to seven innings. A rain delay during the first game of the day forced the second game to a later start. Under a provision in the ABL rules that is modeled on the International Baseball Federation's tiebreaker rule, in any extra inning that starts within an hour of the curfew time for the game—a time set to allow the visiting team time to meet travel schedules to return home at the end of a series—each team starts with runners at first and second base with nobody out. In addition, no new inning may start within 15 minutes of the curfew time. The game was scoreless at the end of the regulation seven innings, and was tied at 1–1 at the end of the eighth inning, which ended at the curfew time. Though the game was an official game, the result did not count towards the season standings.

All but 4 of the scheduled 120 games were played. The four games that were not played were the series scheduled between the Brisbane Bandits and the Canberra Cavalry at the Brisbane Exhibition Ground for the ninth round. Flooding in Brisbane had resulted in the Exhibition Ground being used as an evacuation centre for affected residents. Initially the ABL postponed the series, leaving a decision as to whether the games would be rescheduled to a later time. Just prior to the final round of scheduled games, it was announced that the games would go ahead in the form of two doubleheaders, but that only games that would affect the playoffs would be played. When Brisbane lost the final game of their series against the Adelaide Bite, both they and Canberra were eliminated from contention for the playoffs; hence, the makeup games were not played.

The Perth Heat and Sydney Blue Sox were the first teams to clinch positions in the finals series when Perth defeated the Melbourne Aces in the final game of their series in round 9. The Adelaide Bite were the next team to secure a place in the top four, after winning the third of an expanded six-game series against Brisbane. It was only on the final day of the regular season that Melbourne was able to claim the fourth finals position, and that the makeup of the semi-final series was decided: Sydney hosting Perth in the major semi-final series, and Adelaide hosting Melbourne in the minor semi-final series.

Statistical leaders

Postseason

Format 
At the conclusion of the regular season, the postseason involved the teams in a three-round structure. Each round consisted of a best-of-three-game series between the respective teams. The first- and second-place teams played each other in the major semi-final, the winner of which proceeded directly to the grand final and the loser to the preliminary final. The winner of the minor semi-final between the third- and fourth-place teams also qualified for the preliminary final, while the loser was eliminated. Likewise, the winner of the preliminary final qualified for the championship series, the loser being eliminated.

As in the finals series of previous Claxton Shield tournaments, though each series was hosted by a single team, the role of home team and away team alternated from game to game. For the second game in each series, the visiting team took the role of home team, fielding first, batting second, and wore their away uniform for the game.

Bracket 
 Qualification 

The Perth Heat and Sydney Blue Sox both clinched positions in the top four of the league at the same time: when Perth defeated the Melbourne Aces in the final game of their series at the Melbourne Showgrounds. The Adelaide Bite were the next team to secure a position in the finals, after winning the third of an expanded six-game series against the Brisbane Bandits at Coopers Stadium in Adelaide. Like Sydney, Melbourne secured fourth position through a result that did not involve them: Brisbane's loss in their final game against Adelaide eliminated them from contention for the finals, and since the Canberra Cavalry had already been eliminated by Melbourne's win in its second-last game, Melbourne qualified.

Major semi-final series 
The Sydney Blue Sox hosted the Perth Heat in the major semi-final series at Blacktown Olympic Park. The Blue Sox and Heat split their season series 4–4. This included back-to-back sweeps for each team, with Perth winning the second of the two series, played in Sydney.

Game 1

Game 2

Minor semi-final series 
The Adelaide Bite hosted the Melbourne Aces in the minor semi-final series at Coopers Stadium. The Bite won their season series against the Aces 7–1. Adelaide swept Melbourne 4–0 in the season opening series in Adelaide.

Game 1

Game 2

Preliminary final series

Game 1

Game 2

Game 3

Championship series

Game 1

Game 2

Game 3

Broadcasting 
On 25 January 2011, it was announced that Fox Sports would broadcast live coverage of the championship series. Warren Smith provided the play-by-play commentary, and was joined by Jon Deeble, manager of the Australia national baseball team, for colour commentary.

Awards

References

External links 
The Australian Baseball League – Official ABL Website
Official Baseball Australia Website

 
Australian Baseball League
Australian Baseball League
Australian Baseball League seasons